Yina may refer to:
Downingia yina, a wildflower commonly known as the cascade calicoflower
Yina Moe-Lange, Danish alpine skier